Bethan Winter (born 4 October 1974) is a Welsh Labour Party politician. She has been the Member of Parliament (MP) for Cynon Valley since the 2019 general election. She is a member of the Socialist Campaign Group parliamentary caucus.

Early life and education
Winter was born and raised in Cynon Valley. She graduated with a Bachelor of Science in Social Policy and a Master of Arts in Housing Studies, both from the University of Bristol. She later became a researcher and received a PhD from Swansea University in disadvantage among older people in rural communities.

Career
Winter has worked in RCT for Shelter Cymru and in Penywaun as a community worker, and has also managed a youth club and worked in a food bank. She is an official for the University and College Union.

On entering Parliament following the 2019 general election, Winter was appointed Parliamentary Private Secretary to Rachel Reeves as Shadow Chancellor of the Duchy of Lancaster. However, she resigned in September 2020, when she defied the Labour whip and voted against the Overseas Operations Bill alongside 18 other Labour MPs, including two other junior office holders, Nadia Whittome and Olivia Blake.

On 24 February 2022, following the 2022 Russian invasion of Ukraine, Winter was one of 11 Labour MPs threatened with losing the party whip after they signed a statement by the Stop the War Coalition which questioned the legitimacy of NATO and accused the military alliance of "eastward expansion". All 11 MPs subsequently removed their signatures.

Personal life
Winter has three children. Three generations of her family participated in the September 2019 climate strikes at the Senedd building.

References

External links

Living people
1974 births
21st-century British women politicians
Alumni of Swansea University
Alumni of the University of Bristol
Female members of the Parliament of the United Kingdom for Welsh constituencies
People from Cynon Valley
Welsh Labour Party MPs
Welsh socialists
Welsh-speaking politicians
UK MPs 2019–present